The AEC Regal IV was a bus chassis manufactured by AEC.

History
The AEC Regal IV was AEC's first mainstream underfloor engined vehicle. A prototype was built in 1949, before production commenced in 1952. The first 25 were built to the maximum permissible length of 8.4 metres for London Transport before maximum length for PSVs increased to 9.1 metres.

Over 2,600 were built, London Transport was the largest operator, purchasing over 700, while British European Airways purchased 64 as coaches. Production for UK market finished in 1955 with the introduction of the AEC Reliance but it remained in production for export markets until the 1960s.

References

External links

Regal IV
Vehicles introduced in 1949